Naomi Kathleen Cavaday (born 24 April 1989) is a British former professional tennis player from Sidcup, Kent. She retired in April 2011 to take up a coaching role with the Lawn Tennis Association. At the time of her retirement, she was the British No. 6, with a ranking of world No. 231. Her career-high ranking was 174, achieved in May 2010. She won three ITF singles titles and two ITF doubles titles. Her coach at retirement was Rob Smith. She was formerly coached by David Felgate, the long-time coach of Tim Henman.

In 2014, Cavaday returned to professional tennis, regained a world ranking, and won three additional ITF titles. She finally retired in 2015 and has since worked as a coach and as a commentator for BBC Radio Five Live's Wimbledon coverage and on Amazon Prime.

Personal life
Cavaday was born in Kent. Her mother is a sport psychologist and her brother has played tennis at county level and in America for North Carolina State University. Up to the age of 13 years Cavaday studied at Bromley High School before getting a tennis scholarship to Queenswood School in Hertfordshire. She has also studied at the highly prestigious Nick Bollettieri Tennis Academy in Florida. Cavaday took a course in journalism and creative writing and expressed an interest in becoming a sports journalist when her tennis career was over. She appeared as a guest on the Al Jazeera English programme The Stream in July 2015, as part of a discussion on issues of female body image and its impact on sportswomen regarding their physiques.

Cavaday became an ambassador for Beat, the eating disorder charity, in 2011 and as of 2016 is a mental health ambassador for the LTA.

In July 2019, Cavaday was married  and in November 2020, Cavaday and her husband produced a baby boy .

Career

Junior (2004–2007)
Cavaday competed on the ITF Junior Circuit from May 2004 to July 2007. She was a quarterfinalist at a total of nine tournaments, one of which was the 2006 Wimbledon girls' championships where she lost to Urszula Radwańska, 3–6, 2–6. She reached the semifinals of the ITF Junior Cup Copenhagen, Danish ITF Junior Tournament and the Optus Nottinghill International and was a finalist in the Malta ITF Junior Tournament, Safina Cup, French Riviera International Junior Open and the Tournoi International Juniors de Beaulieu sur Mer. She won one junior singles title at the Istres International Junior Tournament in April 2006 where she also won her only junior doubles title in the same year. Her best result at the Australian Open junior tournament was a first round defeat at the hands of Alizé Cornet, 1–6, 6–7(5), in 2007. She participated in the French Open and US Open junior Grand Slam events only once, losing in the second round of qualifying for the French and the second round of the main draw of the US Open where she lost Tamira Paszek, 6–4, 4–6, 0–6.

Her career-high junior combined ranking was world No. 23 (achieved 19 March 2007) and her win–loss records for her junior career were 55–21 in singles and 28–19 in doubles.

2005–2006
Cavaday made her debut on the ITF Circuit in January 2005 and in only the fourth professional tournament of her career she qualified and beat Isha Lakhani, 6–4, 6–1, in the final to win the event. Nevertheless, she finished 2005 without a world ranking.

In January 2006, Cavaday qualified for and reached the semifinal of the Tipton $10k event and at the start of February she competed in her first ever $25k ITF event in Jersey where she was beaten, 4–6, 1–6, by Anne Keothavong in round one. One month later, Cavaday qualified for Sunderland $10k and reached the final where she was defeated by Gaëlle Widmer in three sets, 1–6, 6–3, 1–6. This was immediately followed by a quarterfinal appearance in the $10k in Sheffield and a semifinal appearance in another $10k event, this one in Bath, where she lost to up-and-comer Urszula Radwańska, 6–7(1), 3–6. In her very next tournament she yet again lost in the semifinal before receiving a wildcard into the Tier III DFS Classic qualifying draw in Birmingham, England. She won one tough three set match against Tatiana Poutchek, 7–6(5), 3–6, 7–6(6), before losing another to Hungarian Melinda Czink, 6–3, 5–7, 5–7. This was followed by Cavaday's first ever Grand Slam main-draw appearance, courtesy of a wildcard into home Grand Slam Wimbledon. She played Japanese veteran Ai Sugiyama and lost 4–6, 5–7. During September and October, Cavaday played in one $10k tournament (where she lost in the quarterfinal) and three $25k tournaments where she reached the semifinals, quarterfinals and second round. She rounded off her 2006 season in Australia with three more $25k tournaments in Mount Gambier, Port Pirie and Nurioopta where she reached the quarterfinal of the first tournament and the first round of the other two. Her year-end ranking of 2006 was world No. 401.

2007
During January and February of 2007, Cavaday competed in two $25k events in Great Britain and reached the quarterfinals of one of them. She then headed to the U.S. in March where she won eight consecutive matches to qualify for and win the $25k in Orange, California. In April she reached the quarterfinal stage in another $25k tournament, this one in Jackson, Mississippi. She reached the semifinal of Palm Beach $25k in May before heading back to England and playing in the main draw of the Tier III DFS Classic courtesy of a wildcard where she beat Vasilisa Bardina, 6–2, 6–1, in round one. She was then demolished by Marion Bartoli, 6–3, 6–1, in the second round. She was immediately given a wildcard into the qualifying draw of the International Women's Open, a Tier II tournament held in Eastbourne, England. She was beaten in a tight two set match by Youlia Fedossova, 7–6(2), 7–6(4), in the first round. A third consecutive wildcard allowed Cavaday entry into the main draw of Wimbledon for the second year running where she was drawn to face a resurgent former multiple Grand Slam champion in the form of Martina Hingis on Court 2, the "Graveyard of Champions". The court almost held true to its name when Cavaday had match points in the second set but failed to convert them, eventually losing 7–6(1), 5–7, 0–6.

After Wimbledon, Cavaday played one more tournament on grass, the $25,000 Felixstowe (where she reached the quarterfinal), before heading to the U.S. in preparation for the US Open qualifying tournament. She was given a wildcard into the qualifying draw for the Tier II event Pilot Pen Tennis in New Haven where she fell just short of qualifying, losing to Tatiana Poutchek in three sets in the final round. She then headed to the US Open qualifying for the first time in her career where she also lost in the final round of qualifying in three sets, this time to German Sandra Klösel. After this, her ranking was high enough to enter her into qualifying for the Tier III Sunfeast Open on merit. She won two matches to qualify before falling in the first round to Ekaterina Ivanova, 3–6, 6–2, 2–6. This was then followed immediately by Cavaday attempting to qualify for the Tier IV Korea Open but again losing one match short of qualifying for the main draw. At the end of the 2007 season, she played four more $25k events (reaching the quarterfinal of one, the semifinal of another and round two in the other two). She then attempted to qualify for the ASB Classic, a Tier IV event in Auckland, where she lost to Ahsha Rolle in the final round, 2–6, 2–6. Her year-end ranking was world No. 196.

2008
From the start of 2008 until the French Open, Cavaday competed primarily in $50,000 and $75k events. She reached the semifinal of New Delhi $50k (losing to Yanina Wickmayer in straight sets, 1–6, 3–6) and the quarterfinals of Patras $50k and Monzon $75k. In May she competed in the qualifying tournament of the French Open for the first time in her career but lost, 3–6, 5–7, in the first round to Stefanie Vögele. In June she received another wildcard into the Tier III DFS Classic where she dominated Jill Craybas with her tricky serve and impressive forehand in the first round to win 6–0, 6–4 before going on to lose in the second round to Indian Sunitha Rao, 6–4, 3–6, 1–6. Compatriot Elena Baltacha then beat her in the opening round of qualifying for the Tier II International Women's Open in Eastbourne in straight sets, 6–2, 6–4. Another wildcard granted Cavaday access to the main draw of Wimbledon for the third year running where she was drawn to face defending champion and 12-time Grand Slam finalist, Venus Williams. She led Williams in the first set but eventually lost, 6–7(5), 1–6, in a match which led Williams to suggest that Cavaday could go far in the game with coaching from her father Richard Williams.

Following Wimbledon, Cavaday hit a patch of bad form, winning only two of her next six matches including losing in round one of qualifying for the US Open to Kristína Kučová, 6–1, 3–6, 1–6. Following this, Cavaday did not play any more matches in 2008 due to a viral infection which saw her unable to train properly for the next three months and struggling to climb flights of stairs. It was the first serious setback Cavaday had been faced with in her young career but she gradually recovered and began light training once again in November in preparation for the 2009 season. She said of the setback, "As an athlete it was very worrying". Her worldwide ranking at the end of 2008 had fallen to No.268.

2009
In her first event since the 2008 US Open qualifying tournament, Cavaday entered Wrexham $10k in January as a wildcard and the No. 2 seed. She reached the semifinal before being overcome by fifth seed Claudine Schaul from Luxembourg, 6–2, 6–0. The very next week she reached the quarterfinal of the $25k tournament in Sutton before falling to compatriot Katie O'Brien, 1–6, 1–6. She then entered the $25k event in Stockholm where she was beaten by Tatjana Malek, 2–6, 1–6, in the semifinals. At the 2009 WTA International Aegon Classic in Birmingham she received a wildcard, and overcame Julie Ditty and 12th seed Tamarine Tanasugarn to reach the third round.

2014: Return to professional tennis
In 2014, Cavaday returned to professional tennis, receiving a wild card into the $50k grass-court tournament in Nottingham, England. Further tournaments in England and in Egypt followed, and in September 2014, she won the first title of her comeback at a $10k tournament in Sharm El Sheikh, Egypt, defeating top seed Barbara Haas at the quarterfinal stage, and second seed Ana Veselinović in the final. In consecutive weeks in October – November 2014, she won back-to-back $10k titles in Stockholm, Sweden., beating Tayisiya Morderger in the first week's final and Margarita Lazareva in the second final.

2015
Cavaday was restricted by a wrist injury in the first half of the year and played only three matches. On 7 October 2015, she posted on her website that she would no longer be competing professionally.

ITF Circuit finals

Singles: 8 (6–2)

Doubles: 6 (2–4)

Performance timelines

Singles

Doubles

Mixed doubles

Fed Cup

References

External links
 Official website
 
 
 

1989 births
Living people
British female tennis players
People educated at Queenswood School
People from Sidcup
People educated at Bromley High School
English female tennis players
Tennis people from Greater London